Eheliyagoda is a town in Ratnapura District, Sabaragamuwa Province, Sri Lanka. It 

The town is the centre of traditional gemstone mining and rubber plantations. Ekanite, a rare radioactive gemstone, was first discovered in Eheliyagoda in 1953 by F. L. D. Ekanayake.

In 2018 Eheliyagoda was identified as a priority town, to be developed under the Small and Medium Town Development Programme being undertaken by the Ministry of Defence and Urban Development. Proposed improvements under the programme include a public fair and play grounds.

Transport

Eheliyagoda was one of the railway stations on the Kelani Valley line, when the narrow gauge railway line between Avissawella to Opanayake via Ratnapura was opened in 1919. It was closed in 1976 when the branch line between Avissawella and Opanayake was shut down.

The town straddles the A4 (Colombo-Batticaloa) Highway.

Educational

The main schools in Eheliyagoda are:
 Eheliyagoda National College (Est. 1904)
 Dharmapala Vidyalaya, Eheliyagoda (Est. 1926)

Religion

The main temples in the town are:
 Pushparama Purana Viharaya
 Madarasinharama Temple
 Mahara Purana Viharaya
 Sri Nagarukkarama Maha Viharaya
 Ambanoluwa Rajamaha Viharaya

References 

Populated places in Sabaragamuwa Province
Ratnapura DS Division